Terri Clark is the debut studio album by the Canadian country music singer of the same name, released on August 8, 1995 on Mercury Nashville Records. It was certified platinum by the RIAA and 3× Platinum by the CRIA. The album produced four singles in both Canada and the U.S.: "Better Things to Do", "When Boy Meets Girl", "If I Were You", and "Suddenly Single". "If I Were You" was a #1 on the Canadian RPM country charts.

Track listing

Personnel
Eddie Bayers – drums
Richard Bennett – electric guitar
Terri Clark – lead vocals, background vocals
Stuart Duncan – fiddle, mandolin
Sonny Garrish – pedal steel guitar, lap steel guitar
John Kelton – cowbell, percussion
B. James Lowry – acoustic guitar
Liana Manis – background vocals
Brent Mason – electric guitar, tic tac bass, six-string bass
Duncan Mullins – bass guitar
Don Potter – acoustic guitar
Matt Rollings – piano
John Wesley Ryles – background vocals
Joe Spivey – fiddle
Biff Watson – acoustic guitar
Dennis Wilson – background vocals
Glenn Worf – bass guitar

Chart performance

References

1995 debut albums
Terri Clark albums
Mercury Nashville albums
Albums produced by Keith Stegall
Canadian Country Music Association Album of the Year albums